Diane Eve Warren (born September 7, 1956) is an American songwriter. She has won an Academy Honorary Award, Grammy Award, an Emmy Award, two Golden Globe Awards, and, three consecutive Billboard Music Awards for Songwriter of the Year.

Warren's career was jump-started in 1985 with "Rhythm of the Night" by DeBarge. In the late 1980s, she joined forces with the UK music company EMI, where she became the first songwriter in the history of Billboard magazine to have seven hits, all by different artists, on the singles chart at the same time, prompting EMI's UK Chairman Peter Reichardt to call her "the most important songwriter in the world". She has been rated the third most successful female artist in the UK.

Warren has written nine number-one songs and 32 top-10 songs on the Billboard Hot 100 including "If I Could Turn Back Time" (Cher, 1989), "Because You Loved Me" (Celine Dion, 1996), "How Do I Live" (LeAnn Rimes, 1997), and "I Don't Want to Miss a Thing" (Aerosmith, 1998).  Two of the top 13 hits in the Hot 100's 57-year history were composed by Warren.  She has been inducted into the Songwriters Hall of Fame and received a star on the Hollywood Walk of Fame. Her UK success saw her win an Ivor Novello Award when she received the Special International Award in 2008. Warren has been nominated for 14 competitive Academy Award nominations without a win; she received an honorary Oscar at the Governors Awards in November 2022.

She controls the rights over her music through her publishing company, Realsongs. Her debut album was released on August 27, 2021.

Early life
Warren, the youngest of three daughters, was born to David, an insurance salesman, and Flora Warren, in the Los Angeles community of Van Nuys, where she said she felt misunderstood and "alienated" as a child growing up. Her family's surname "Warren" was originally "Wolfberg", but her father changed the name because he wanted it to sound less Jewish. Warren says she was rebellious as a child and told NPR's Scott Simon that she got into trouble and ran away as a teen but returned because she missed her cat.

As a child, Warren loved listening and dreamed of performing on the radio herself. She was also influenced by music by her parents and her sisters, who would play music. She began writing music when she was 11 but took a more serious approach at 14, commenting "music saved me." Warren has said that her mother asked her to give up her dream of a songwriting career and take a secretarial job. However, her father continued to believe in her and encouraged her. In addition, he bought her a 12-string guitar and a metal shed for her to practice and took her to music auditions. She wrote Celine Dion's 1996 song "Because You Loved Me" as a tribute to her father for his encouragement.

She attended Los Angeles Pierce College and graduated from California State University, Northridge in 1978, but largely considered her education a waste as she focused most of her time on improving her songwriting skills instead of on her education.

On the February 12, 2016, edition of All Things Considered, Warren said that she had been molested at age 12 and had later experienced sexual harassment and assault by a sound engineer during her working career.

Career
Warren's first hit was "Solitaire", which Laura Branigan took to No. 7 in the US pop charts in 1983.

The original name for her publishing company, Realsongs, was "Warren Piece" because "War and Peace" was already taken. In 1998, Realsongs and its international partner, EMI Music Publishing, distributed A Passion For Music, a six-CD box set showcasing her music. EMI Music's London office assisted in distributing 1,200 copies of the box set primarily to the film and television industry for consideration in soundtracks and other commercial endeavors.  It was not marketed to consumers.  , Warren's music has appeared in the soundtracks of over sixty films.  She was awarded a star on the Hollywood Walk of Fame in 2001.

The Diane Warren Foundation, in conjunction with the ASCAP Foundation and the VH1 Save the Music Foundation created a joint initiative, beginning in 2000, called Music in the Schools. The initiative provides sheet music, band arrangements, folios, and method books to each of the schools that are already recipients of musical instruments from the VH1 Save the Music Foundation.

In 2004, Warren released a compilation album of love songs titled Diane Warren Presents Love Songs, which includes several of her hits.

Warren continues to write hit songs for and with artists of all mainstream genres, including Stevie B.,
Celine Dion, Cheap Trick, En Vogue, Whitney Houston, Belinda Carlisle, Taylor Dayne, 
Britney Spears, Marcia Hines, Alice Cooper, Christina Aguilera, Beyoncé, TLC, Aaliyah, Heart, Agnetha Fältskog, Elton John, Cher, Tina Turner, Bryan Adams, Selena, Jessica Simpson, Air Supply, Olivia Newton-John, Barbra Streisand, Aretha Franklin, Roberta Flack, Roy Orbison, Trisha Yearwood, Patti LaBelle, Michael Bolton, NSYNC, Rene Froger, Gloria Estefan, Reba McEntire, Enrique Iglesias, Paloma Faith, Russell Watson, Rod Stewart, RBD, Aerosmith, The Cult, Kiss, Ricky Martin, Faith Hill, Michael W. Smith, Meat Loaf, Sugababes, Mariah Carey, Toni Braxton, Exposé, Leigh Nash of Sixpence None the Richer, LeAnn Rimes, Gavin DeGraw, Kierra Sheard, Mandy Moore, Hilary Duff, Haylie Duff, Lindsay Lohan, Lady Gaga, Chrissy Metz, Claire Richards, Starship, and Westlife, producing some of the songs as well. Her songs have been covered by artists including Joe Cocker, Weezer, Edwin McCain, Milli Vanilli, Mark Chesnutt, and Sara Evans.

Warren wrote three songs for Carrie Underwood's debut album, Some Hearts (2005) that were "Lessons Learned", "Whenever You Remember" and the title track, originally written for Marshall Crenshaw.

In 2009, Warren co-wrote the United Kingdom's entry in the Eurovision Song Contest with Andrew Lloyd Webber. The song "It's My Time"
 was sung by Jade Ewen and achieved 5th place, the best for the UK since 2002.

In 2010, Warren partnered with Avon Products as a celebrity judge for Avon Voices, Avon's global online singing talent search for women and songwriting competition for men and women. For the contest, Warren wrote a special anthem which was recorded by the finalists and produced by Humberto Gatica.
Warren has been recognized six times as ASCAP Songwriter of the Year and four times as Billboard's Songwriter of the Year.

In 2012, Warren wrote the song "Counterfeit" for Tulisa's debut solo album The Female Boss.

Warren wrote Paloma Faith's 2014 song "Only Love Can Hurt Like This".

Warren's success in the US has been paralleled in the UK, where she has been rated the third most successful female artist. Peter Reichardt, former Chairman of EMI Music Publishing UK, credited her as "the most important songwriter in the world."

Warren is the first songwriter in the history of Billboard magazine to have seven hits, all by different artists, on the singles chart at the same time. Warren has had nine of her compositions hit #1 in the US Billboard Hot 100, all by different artists, and overall more than 30 of her songs have hit the US top ten. Additionally, two of the top 13 hits in the Hot 100's 57-year history were written by her - "How Do I Live" (number four) and "Un-Break My Heart" (number 13). She has had even more success on the US Adult Contemporary charts, where sixteen of her songs have gone to #1, and overall more than 40 songs have hit the top ten on that chart. Warren has had three #1 hits in the UK and more than 20 top ten hits. She has been inducted into the Songwriters Hall of Fame and received a star on the Hollywood Walk of Fame.

Warren's debut studio album, Diane Warren: The Cave Sessions Vol. 1, was released on August 27, 2021, via Di-Namic Records and BMG. Its first single, "Times like This" with Darius Rucker, was released on November 10, 2020. The second single, "She's Fire" with G-Eazy and Carlos Santana, was released on July 13, 2021. The single "Seaside" with Rita Ora, Sofía Reyes, and Reik was released on the same day as the album.

Personal life
Warren has never married, and does not think of herself as a person of commitment. In interviews, she has said that she believes that her lack of a romantic life makes her more peculiar as a songwriter. She was in a relationship with songwriter and record producer Guy Roche that ended in 1992 and claims she has not had another relationship since, commenting "I've never been in love like in my songs. I'm not like normal people. I'm no good at relationships. I draw drama to me—it's the Jew in me". Warren considers herself to be cynical regarding romance, but she does not let this affect her songwriting and prefers to write alone rather than co-writing, commenting "When I write with other people, the experience is different. You have to compromise, which I have problems with. I'd rather listen to my own mind".

In a 2000 interview, Warren explained that she never let go of music despite experiencing rejections, depression and poverty. In 1994, Warren's house was damaged by the Northridge earthquake, causing her to be miserable and homeless, drifting from hotels to rental houses. She has said that therapy helped her with songwriting. She has also revealed that she works 12–16 hours a day, always takes her keyboard whenever she travels and is "...more crazy and intense than I was at 20..."

Warren does not usually allow anyone into her Hollywood Hills office, which she describes as a "cluttered, airless room". In 2012, Warren said that nothing in her office had been cleaned or moved for 17 years because she is superstitious; she prefers to think of that room as her "secret world". In that room, Warren records melodies with a tape recorder on which she plays them again and chooses the songs she likes the most. Warren did allow part of a 2016 interview with CBS News Sunday Morning correspondent Ben Tracy to be taped in the office. On August 1, 2022, she began a Twitter feud with Gordon Ramsay.

Warren is autistic and believes her condition made her a better songwriter.

Legacy
A jukebox musical is to be written by Joe DiPietro and directed by Kathleen Marshall, titled Obsessed, The Story of Diane Warren...so far. Warren has penned nine No. 1 and 32 top-10 hits on the Billboard Hot 100 chart since 1983.

Awards and nominations

Discography (as artist)

Studio albums

Compilation albums

Singles

Top-ten hits written by Diane Warren

(Top-ten entry date – Song – Artist)
 May 14, 1983 – "Solitaire" – Laura Branigan
 Apr 06, 1985 – "Rhythm of the Night" – DeBarge
 Mar 14, 1987 – "Nothing's Gonna Stop Us Now" – Starship
 Oct 03, 1987 – "Who Will You Run To" – Heart
 Feb 27, 1988 – "I Get Weak" – Belinda Carlisle
 Aug 06, 1988 – "I Don't Wanna Live Without Your Love" – Chicago
 Nov 19, 1988 – "Look Away" – Chicago
 Sep 09, 1989 – "If I Could Turn Back Time" – Cher
 Oct 28, 1989 – "When I See You Smile" – Bad English
 Nov 11, 1989 – "Blame It on the Rain" – Milli Vanilli
 Dec 16, 1989 – "Just Like Jesse James" – Cher
 Mar 10, 1990 – "Love Will Lead You Back" – Taylor Dayne
 Apr 21, 1990 – "How Can We Be Lovers?" – Michael Bolton
 Jun 23, 1990 – "I'll Be Your Shelter" – Taylor Dayne
 Jul 21, 1990 – "When I'm Back on My Feet Again" – Michael Bolton
 Sep 07, 1991 – "Time, Love and Tenderness" – Michael Bolton
 Nov 09, 1991 – "Set the Night to Music" – Roberta Flack with Maxi Priest
 Jun 06, 1992 – "If You Asked Me To" – Celine Dion
 Dec 26, 1992 – "Saving Forever for You" – Shanice
 Jul 03, 1993 – "I'll Never Get Over You Getting Over Me" – Exposé
 Jun 04, 1994 – "Don't Turn Around" – Ace of Base
 Mar 16, 1996 – "Because You Loved Me" – Celine Dion
 Nov 02, 1996 – "Un-Break My Heart" – Toni Braxton
 Mar 15, 1997 – "For You I Will" – Monica
 Aug 09, 1997 – "How Do I Live" – LeAnn Rimes
 Nov 08, 1997 – "The One I Gave My Heart To" – Aaliyah
 May 16, 1998 – "The Arms of the One Who Loves You" – Xscape
 Sep 05, 1998 – "I Don't Want to Miss a Thing" – Aerosmith
 Dec 12, 1998 – "Have You Ever?" – Brandy
 Oct 16, 1999 – "Music of My Heart" – Gloria Estefan and NSYNC
 Jul 01, 2000 – "I Turn to You" – Christina Aguilera
 Jun 30, 2001 – "There You'll Be" – Faith Hill
Note: Bold denotes chart-topper.

See also
List of songs written by Diane Warren
Because You Loved Me: The Songs of Diane Warren
Nina Sings the Hits of Diane Warren
When a Woman Loves

References

External links

 
 Interview for the BBC
 Interview, HitQuarters May 2005
 Interview with Diane Warren by Paul Tingen in Sound on Sound magazine
 Theodoreandcallum.com
 Interview, CBS Sunday Morning 2016

APRA Award winners
Jewish American songwriters
Songwriters from California
Musicians from Los Angeles
Grammy Award winners
Golden Globe Award-winning musicians
Ivor Novello Award winners
People from Van Nuys, Los Angeles
Primetime Emmy Award winners
1956 births
Living people
20th-century American women musicians
21st-century American women musicians
People on the autism spectrum